Markéta Zeitler Štusková (born 9 April 1974) is a Czech former professional tennis player.

Štusková, who comes from Rožnov pod Radhoštěm, made her only WTA Tour main-draw appearance in 1992, playing doubles at the Prague Open with Petra Holubová.

During her career she won four ITF doubles titles, including $25,000 tournaments in Vall d'Hebron and Sopot.

Now living in Austria, Štusková is the mother of amateur golfer Lea Zeitler, who represented Austria at the 2014 Summer Youth Olympics.

ITF finals

Doubles: 11 (4–7)

References

External links
 
 

1974 births
Living people
Czechoslovak female tennis players
Czech female tennis players
Czech emigrants to Austria
People from Rožnov pod Radhoštěm
Sportspeople from the Zlín Region